NGC 3007 is an edge-on, magnitude 13.4, lenticular galaxy in the constellation of Sextans, discovered by Édouard Stephan on March 16, 1855. It is about 115 thousand light years across, and with a recessional velocity of 6,520 kilometers per second, is at a distance of over 300 million light-years from the Sun.

References 

Lenticular galaxies
Sextans (constellation)
3007
028150